The Chemical Educator is a peer-reviewed journal in chemical education. It was published by Springer-Verlag from 1996 to 2002, and has been published online independently since 2003. The journal publishes six issues per volume and one volume per year, on current topics, experiments, and teaching methodology.

External links
 Official website.
 Journal on SpringerLink

Chemistry journals
Publications established in 1996